Gregg Guenther, Jr. (born January 29, 1982, in Calabasas, CA) was a National Football League tight end for the Cincinnati Bengals.

College career
Guenther played basketball and football at the University of Southern California. He played in 24 football games, starting 8 of them, during which he totaled 24 receptions for 206 yards and three touchdowns.  He opted to not play football his senior year in order to concentrate on basketball.  He played power forward and center for four years with the Trojans' basketball team and averaged 5.5 points and 4.4 rebounds a game.

Professional career
As a member of the Tennessee Titans, Guenther played under head coach Jeff Fisher, who attended the same high school (Taft in Woodland Hills, California) and college (USC) as Guenther.  He also played under Titans' offensive coordinator Norm Chow while at USC.  During the 2005 season, Guenther appeared in five games with two receptions for 13 yards.

On September 3, 2006, Guenther was waived by the Tennessee Titans. By November 1, 2006, Guenther signed with the Cincinnati Bengals practice squad under head coach Marvin Lewis. Guenther was waived from the Cincinnati Bengals in June 2007.

References

1982 births
Living people
American football tight ends
USC Trojans football players
USC Trojans men's basketball players
Tennessee Titans players
People from Calabasas, California
Players of American football from California
Sportspeople from Los Angeles County, California
American men's basketball players